Ahli United Bank is a regional bank based in Bahrain. Its head office is situated at Manama and is the largest bank in Bahrain. It is present in 8 countries in the Middle East and United Kingdom. Ahli United bank's ordinary shares are listed on Bahrain Stock Exchange since August 2000 and the Kuwait Stock Exchange since June 2006.

History
Ahli United Bank established in May 2000 following a merger between The United Bank of Kuwait and Al-Ahli Commercial Bank, and it is licensed by the Central Bank of Bahrain under a retail banking license. Following the merger, both entities became fully owned subsidiaries of Ahli United Bank.

Operations
The AUB (Ahli United Bank) Group provides retail banking, corporate banking, treasury and investment services, private banking and wealth management services and Islamic banking products and services. Additionally, the Group also provides life insurance products in both conventional and Takaful schemes.

In 2016, Ahli United Bank started its operations in the UAE through Ahli United Bank Limited (AUBL) in DIFC, Dubai, under a category 1 license.

In 2018, Ahli United Bank signed an agreement with Bahrain’s labor fund, Tamkeen, to provide a BHD 40 million portfolio for subsidized financing to eligible medium and large-sized enterprises in Bahrain.

Major shareholders
Public Institution For Social Security - Kuwait (18.67%)
Social Insurance Organization - Bahrain (10.01%)
Tamdeen Investment Co. - Kuwait (7.71%)

Business divisions
The AUB Group operations consist of four core business divisions, all also offering Islamic finance products: Corporate Banking, Treasury and Investments, Retail Banking, Private Banking and Wealth Management.

Islamic finance
Ahli United Bank provides Sharia-compliant banking services through the Islamic banking subsidiary, Ahli United Bank K.S.C.P., Ahli United Bank (UK) PLC. In April 2010, the Bank of Kuwait and the Middle East was converted to a fully Sharia-compliant Islamic banking institution, and its name was changed to Ahli United Bank K.S.C. After that, the Group launched Islamic banking services in the first quarter of 2013, through an associate in Oman, Ahli Bank S.A.O.G. The AUB Group launched its Islamic banking services formally under the name, Al-Hilal.

Entities
Ahli United Bank B.S.C
Ahli United Bank B.S.C. (DIFC Branch)
Ahli United Bank (UK) P.L.C
Alhilal Islamic
Ahli United Bank (Egypt) S.A.E
Ahli United Bank K.S.C.P
Ahli Bank S.O.A.G
Commercial Bank of Iraq P.S.C
United Bank for Commerce & Investment S.A.L.

Regional awards
2009 – Best Bank in Middle East Award – Global Finance
2012 – Euromoney Awards for Excellence
2014 – Best Regional Bank in the GCC – Capital Finance International
2016 – Middle east bank of the year – The Banker
2016 – Best Regional Bank in the GCC – Capital Finance International

See also

List of banks in Bahrain

References

Banks of Bahrain